Hans Platz (13 December 1919 — 22 October 1988) was German chess player.

Biography
Hans Platz was started in 1938 as an 18-year-old for Magdeburg in Bernburg chess tournament. In the 1950s he was one of the leading East Germany chess players. In 1951, in Schwerin Hans Platz won bronze medal in East Germany Chess Championship. Later he worked as association chess trainer in the East German Chess Federation.

Hans Platz played for East Germany in the Chess Olympiads:
 In 1952, at third board in the 10th Chess Olympiad in Helsinki (+6, =3, -6),
 In 1956, at second reserve board in the 12th Chess Olympiad in Moscow (+4, =4, -2).

References

External links

Hans Platz chess games at 365chess.com

1919 births
1988 deaths
German chess players
East German chess players
Chess Olympiad competitors
20th-century chess players